Cozla may refer to:

 Cozla, a village in Berzasca Commune, Caraş-Severin County, Romania
 Cozla, a village in Letca Commune, Sălaj County, Romania